is a Japanese former gravure idol and actress. She was represented with Suns Entertainment.

Biography
After graduating from Aoyama Gakuin University English and American Literature Department, she once worked as an office lady for IT Kigyō in March 2011. After working for six months, she was later scouted by Suns Entertainment president Yoshiharu Noda and made her debut as a gravure idol in 2012. She announced her photobook Alisa and the DVD Milky Glamour later in the year. In 2015 she retired from the entertainment industry.

Publications

Photobooks

DVD

Filmography

Internet series

Stage

Radio

Variety

TV drama

Advertisements

Internet radio

Notes

References

See also
Gravure idol

External links

1989 births
Actors from Fukuoka Prefecture
Aoyama Gakuin University alumni
Japanese actresses
Japanese expatriates in Taiwan
Japanese idols
Living people
Models from Fukuoka Prefecture